List of criminal competencies is a listing of the various types of competencies relevant to the defendant in criminal law in the  United States. In the U.S. the  law is permeated with competency issues since a state may not subject an individual who is "incompetent" to trial on criminal charges. In insisting on this requirement the law is acting on the premise that society recognizes only the actions of an autonomous individual. This is a list of the most relevant competencies that must be evaluated (if a question of incompetency is raised) in order to proceed.

Criminal Competencies
 Competency to Consent to a Search or Seizure - Fourth Amendment (Mapp v. Ohio, Katz v. United States, Florida v. Rodriguez)
 Competency to Stand Trial -  (Dusky v. United States)
 Competency to Waive Right to Competency -  (United States v. Morin)
 Competency to Confess - (Brown v. Mississippi, Miranda v. Arizona. Colorado v. Connelly)
 Competency to Plead Guilty - (Seiling v. Eyman, Godinez v. Moran)
 Competency to Waive the Right to Counsel - (Godinez v. Moran, McKaskle v. Wiggins, Faretta v. California)
 Competency to Refuse an Insanity Defense  - (Frendak v. United States)
 Competency to Testify
Legal Requirements for Testimonial Competence - Federal Rules of Evidence,  Rule 601
Assessment of Witness Credibility - Federal Rules of Evidence, Rule 508
 Competency to Be Sentenced and Executed - (Saddler v. United States)
 Competency at the Sentencing Proceedings (Chavez v. United States)
 Competency to Be Imprisoned or Executed -  (Ford v. Wainwright, Penry v. Lynaugh, Panetti v. Quarterman )
 Competency to Refuse Treatment  - (Perry v. Louisiana)

See also
Competency evaluation
Adjudicative competence

Footnotes

United States law-related lists
Competencies, criminal
Crime-related lists
Law-related lists
Forensic psychology
Mental health law in the United States
United States criminal procedure